John Kitching is a male former athlete who competed for England.

Athletics career
He represented England in the high jump at the 1958 British Empire and Commonwealth Games in Cardiff, Wales.

Personal life
He was a member of the Achilles Club and also threw the javelin.

References

English male high jumpers
Athletes (track and field) at the 1958 British Empire and Commonwealth Games
Commonwealth Games competitors for England